Márton Sipos (19 January 1900 – 11 December 1926) was a Hungarian swimmer. He competed in the men's 200 metre breaststroke event at the 1924 Summer Olympics.

References

External links
 

1900 births
1926 deaths
Hungarian male swimmers
Olympic swimmers of Hungary
Swimmers at the 1924 Summer Olympics
People from Szekszárd
Male breaststroke swimmers
Sportspeople from Tolna County
20th-century Hungarian people